The 115th Infantry Division (115. Infanterie-Division) was a formation of the Imperial German Army in World War I.  The division was formed on April 2, 1915, and organized over the next several weeks. It was part of a wave of new infantry divisions formed in the spring of 1915.  The division was disbanded in 1919 during the demobilization of the German Army after World War I.

The division was formed primarily from the excess infantry regiments of regular infantry divisions which were being triangularized.  The division's 229th Infantry Brigade staff was formerly the staff of the 82nd Infantry Brigade of the 39th Infantry Division, which came to the new division along with the 171st Infantry Regiment.  The 40th Reserve Infantry Regiment was formerly part of the 28th Reserve Division.  The 136th Infantry Regiment came from the 30th Infantry Division.  The 40th Reserve Infantry Regiment was raised in the Grand Duchy of Baden.  The 136th Infantry and the 171st Infantry were Alsace-Lorraine regiments, but mainly drew from the Rhineland.  Cavalry support came in the form of Baden dragoons.  The artillery and combat engineer units were newly formed.

Combat chronicle

The 115th Infantry Division initially fought on the Western Front in World War I, entering the line in the Artois in April 1915, fighting in the Second Battle of Artois, and then moving to the Aisne region.  On July 30, the division left the line and was transported to the Eastern Front, arriving in August and entering the line in the siege of Kovno.  It participated in the Gorlice-Tarnów Offensive and was in the line until November 1916, when it went to the Romanian Front.  It fought on the Romanian front into late 1917, and then remained in Romania for several months after the armistice on that front.  In April 1918, the division was transported back to the Western Front.  After a period in reserve and on the Belgian/Dutch border, it entered combat in June 1916 in the Champagne region.  It remained in the Champagne, Verdun and Woëvre regions and then fought against the Meuse-Argonne Offensive.  Allied intelligence rated the division as third class.

Order of battle on formation

The 115th Infantry Division was formed as a triangular division.  The order of battle of the division on April 3, 1915, was as follows:

229. Infanterie-Brigade
Reserve-Infanterie-Regiment Nr. 40
4. Lothringisches Infanterie-Regiment Nr. 136
2. Ober-Elsässiches Infanterie-Regiment Nr. 171
1.Eskadron/3. Badisches Dragoner-Regiment Prinz Karl Nr. 22
2.Eskadron/3. Badisches Dragoner-Regiment Prinz Karl Nr. 22
Feldartillerie-Regiment Nr. 229
Fußartillerie-Batterie Nr. 115
Pionier-Kompanie Nr. 229

Late-war order of battle

The division underwent relatively few organizational changes over the course of the war.  Cavalry was reduced, artillery and signals commands were formed, and combat engineer support was expanded to a full pioneer battalion.  The order of battle on February 1, 1918, was as follows:

229. Infanterie-Brigade
Reserve-Infanterie-Regiment Nr. 40
4. Lothringisches Infanterie-Regiment Nr. 136
2. Ober-Elsässiches Infanterie-Regiment Nr. 171
2.Eskadron/3. Badisches Dragoner-Regiment Prinz Karl Nr. 22
Artillerie-Kommandeur 115
Feldartillerie-Regiment Nr. 229
Fußartillerie-Bataillon Nr. 94 (from May 1, 1918)
Pionier-Bataillon Nr. 43
3. Reserve-Kompanie/Pionier-Bataillon Nr. 33
Pionier-Kompanie Nr. 229
Minenwerfer-Kompanie Nr. 115
Divisions-Nachrichten-Kommandeur 115

References
 115. Infanterie-Division (Chronik 1915/1918) - Der erste Weltkrieg
 Hermann Cron et al., Ruhmeshalle unserer alten Armee (Berlin, 1935)
 Hermann Cron, Geschichte des deutschen Heeres im Weltkriege 1914-1918 (Berlin, 1937)
 Günter Wegner, Stellenbesetzung der deutschen Heere 1825-1939. (Biblio Verlag, Osnabrück, 1993), Bd. 1
 Histories of Two Hundred and Fifty-One Divisions of the German Army which Participated in the War (1914-1918), compiled from records of Intelligence section of the General Staff, American Expeditionary Forces, at General Headquarters, Chaumont, France 1919 (1920)

Notes

Infantry divisions of Germany in World War I
Military units and formations established in 1915
Military units and formations disestablished in 1919
1915 establishments in Germany